Military College Sui is a military school located in the town of Sui in the Balochistan province of Pakistan. It is owned and operated by the Pakistan Army and feeds the Pakistan Military Academy, Kakul.

Previously, it was known as Sui Cantonment.

History
It was established in 2011. 60 percent of seats were reserved for the students of Balochistan.

References

External links 

Schools in Balochistan, Pakistan
Cadet colleges in Pakistan
Dera Bugti District
Pakistan Military Academy